Stephen Laybutt (born 3 September 1977) is an Australian footballer.

Playing career
Laybutt was released by Dutch side Feyenoord in January 2002 to return to Australia, following a loan spell at Lyn Oslo, due to a lack of first team opportunities.

In January 2008, Laybutt suffered an achilles tendon rupture, ruling him out for the remainder of the 2008–09 A-League.

Personal life 
Following his playing career, Laybutt came out as gay. As of 2021, Laybutt worked in the rehab unit at St Vincent's Hospital in Sydney. There, he met patient Ian Pavey, to whom he donated a kidney.

Club statistics

National team statistics

Australia score listed first, score column indicates score after each Laybutt goal

Honours
With Australia:
 OFC Nations Cup: 2000, 2004
With Sydney Olympic:
 NSL Championship: 2001-2002

References

External links
 Oz Football profile
 

1977 births
Living people
People from the Central Tablelands
Association football defenders
Australian soccer players
Australian expatriate soccer players
Australia international soccer players
Olympic soccer players of Australia
A-League Men players
National Soccer League (Australia) players
J1 League players
Eredivisie players
Belgian Pro League players
Eliteserien players
RBC Roosendaal players
Brisbane Strikers FC players
Lyn Fotball players
Feyenoord players
K.A.A. Gent players
Newcastle Jets FC players
Parramatta Power players
Royal Excel Mouscron players
Shonan Bellmare players
Sydney Olympic FC players
Expatriate footballers in Japan
Expatriate footballers in the Netherlands
Expatriate footballers in Belgium
Expatriate footballers in Norway
Australian expatriate sportspeople in Japan
Australian expatriate sportspeople in the Netherlands
Australian expatriate sportspeople in Belgium
Australian expatriate sportspeople in Norway
Wollongong Wolves FC players
Australian Institute of Sport soccer players
Sportsmen from New South Wales
Soccer players from New South Wales
2000 OFC Nations Cup players
Footballers at the 2000 Summer Olympics
2004 OFC Nations Cup players
Australian LGBT sportspeople
Australian LGBT soccer players